Shaheed Alam (born 9 July 1998) is a Singaporean tennis player.

Alam has a career high ATP singles ranking of 1743 achieved on 5 March 2018. He also has a career high ATP doubles ranking of 2116 achieved on 6 January 2020.

Alam represents Singapore at the Davis Cup, where he has a W/L record of 25–12.

Alam plays for Keiser University Seahawks in the National Association of Intercollegiate Athletes (NAIA) where he is currently ranked No. 10 in the nation.

References

External links

1998 births
Living people
Singaporean tennis players